Felix Bürkner (15 May 1883 – 17 November 1957) was a German equestrian. He competed in the individual dressage event at the 1912 Summer Olympics.

References

External links
 

1883 births
1957 deaths
German male equestrians
Olympic equestrians of Germany
Equestrians at the 1912 Summer Olympics
Sportspeople from Göttingen